The City Life Comedian of the Year competition is held annually in Manchester, and sponsored by the City Life magazine.

The competition began in 1990, and has become one of the most prestigious comedy awards in the North West of England, mostly based on the subsequent success of many of its entrants and winners.

The competition is open to all, and early heats often have a broad mix of talent and ability.  From each heat, the entrants are whittled down to eight finalists.

In the first year, the competition was won by Caroline Aherne, who went on to create Mrs Merton and The Royle Family and in subsequent years all three writers of the successful sitcom Phoenix Nights - Peter Kay, Dave Spikey and Neil Fitzmaurice - won the competition.  Notable runners-up include Dave Gorman, Archie Kelly and Johnny Vegas.

Winners 
 1990 - Sister Mary Immaculate (Caroline Aherne)
 1991 - Dave Spikey 
 1992 - Shared by Stan Vernon and Paul Glasswell 
 1993 - Tony Mills (now Tony Burgess)
 1994 - Dave Rothnie
 1995 - Chris Addison
 1996 - Peter Kay
 1997 - Shared by Neil Anthony (now Neil Fitzmaurice) and Dom Carroll
 1998 - Steve Harris
 1999 - Jason Manford 
 2000 - Justin Moorhouse
 2001 - John Bishop
 2002 - Phil Walker
 2003 - Seymour Mace
 2004 - John Warburton
 2005 - Andy Watson
 2006 - Vince Atta
 2007 - Tim Craven
 2008 - Eddie Hoo
 2009 - no competition

References

External links
City Life website
Pride Of Manchester's guide to live comedy in Manchester
Manchester Alternative Comedy

British comedy and humour awards
Comedy competitions
Culture in Manchester
English awards